The Bloudy Tenent of Persecution, for Cause of Conscience, Discussed in a Conference between Truth and Peace is a 1644 book about government force written by Roger Williams, the founder of Providence Plantations in New England and the co-founder of the First Baptist Church in America. Tenent is an obsolete variant of tenet, and the book argues for a "wall of separation" between church and state and for state toleration of various Christian denominations, including Catholicism, and also "paganish, Jewish, Turkish or anti-Christian consciences and worships." The book takes the form of a dialogue between Truth and Peace and is a response to correspondence by Boston minister John Cotton regarding Cotton's support for state enforcement of religious uniformity in Massachusetts Bay Colony. Williams argues that Christianity requires the existence of a separate civil authority which may not generally infringe upon liberty of conscience, which Williams interpreted to be a God-given right.

Impact
The 1644 text is considered one of Williams' best-developed arguments, even though it was written under presumably rushed conditions and is stylistically difficult. Many of the original copies of The Bloudy Tenent were burned by order of a Parliamentary faction offended by his view of government. John Cotton responded to the book by defending his positions in The Bloudy Tenent, Washed, and Made White in the Bloud of the Lamb. Upon his return to London in 1652, Williams published a defense of his positions and responded to Cotton in The Bloudy Tenent Yet More Bloudy by Mr. Cotton's Endeavour to Wash it White in the Blood of the Lamb; of Whose Precious Blood, Spilt in the Bloud of his Servants; and of the Blood of Millions Spilt in Former and Later Wars for Conscience Sake, That Most Bloody Tenent of Persecution for Cause of Conscience, upon, a Second Tryal Is Found More Apparently and More Notoriously Guilty, etc. (London, 1652). The Bloudy Tenent has been cited as a philosophical source for John Locke, the First Amendment to the United States Constitution, and several writings of Thomas Jefferson regarding religious freedom.

Biblical support for preventing governmental interference in religious matters
In the Bloudy Tenent and other writings, Williams interpreted many passages in the Old and New Testaments as limiting governmental interference in any religious matters, and therefore opposing the traditional Puritan exegesis which supported using state force in some religious matters:
Williams believed that historic Israel was a unique covenant kingdom and the kings should be interpreted using typology. Therefore, the covenant kings were not appropriate government models for New Testament Christians, who believed that the Old Testament covenant had been fulfilled through Christ, as the ultimate king. Accordingly, Williams asserted that the more informative Old Testament examples of civil government were good non-covenant kings such as Artaxerxes, a pagan who gave the Hebrews freedom to worship in  but did not compel any kind of worship. For examples of bad kings, Williams mentioned Nebuchadnezzar in the Book of Daniel who oppressively forced the Jews (including Daniel, Shadrach, Meshach, and Abednego) to worship the state god or face death.
He specifically defined the "weeds" as heretics who were clearly not Christians, such as Paul before his conversion, and not simply people with minor theological differences, as the Puritans asserted. Ultimately, he argued, it is God's duty to judge, not man's.
Williams interpreted  to support the use of spiritual weapons rather than civil weapons, and pointed out that Christ's letters in these chapters were written to and applied to churches, not to civil governments. Williams interpreted 's Beast of Revelation prophecy as representing all state churches that used governmental force to coerce political goals in the name of Christianity, including those in Europe and Massachusetts.

See also
Roger Williams
A Key into the Language of America
Christian debate on persecution and toleration

References

External links
The Bloody Tenent of Persecution (1867 reprint) (accessed July 10, 2009, on Google Books)
 Text of book
Roger Williams, Richard Groves, [https://books.google.com/books?id=YC-Oy0hswEkC The bloudy tenent of persecution for cause of conscience: discussed in a conference between truth and peace : who, in all tender affection, present to the High Court of Parliament, (as the result of their discourse) these, (among other passages) of highest consideration] (Mercer University Press, 2001)0865547661, 9780865547667 (accessible on Google Books, July 28, 2009)

1644 books
17th-century Christian texts
History books about the United States
History of religion in the United States
Rhode Island culture
Separation of church and state in the United States